Piotr Rychlik (born 1984 in Olsztyn) is a Polish diplomat who serves as an ambassador of Poland to Finland since 2019.

Life 
Rychlik has graduated from law at the University of Warmia and Mazury in Olsztyn. In 2013 he defended there his PhD thesis on forensic aspects of terrorism. He has been working in Olsztyn as an assistant professor.

In 2009 he joined the Ministry of Foreign Affairs of Poland, Legal and Treaty Department. He was responsible for the status of diplomatic properties in Poland and abroad, legal aspects of international terrorism and sanctions. Since February 2018 he has been director of the Legal and Treaty Department. He was head of the Polish delegations to the United Nations, the European of the Union Council, the Council of Europe. On 9 October 2019 he became Poland ambassador to Finland, presenting his letter of credence to the president Sauli Niinistö.

Besides Polish, he speaks English, and Italian.

References 

1984 births
Ambassadors of Poland to Finland
International law scholars
Living people
People from Olsztyn
Polish legal scholars
University of Warmia and Mazury in Olsztyn alumni
Academic staff of the University of Warmia and Mazury in Olsztyn